Hey Landlord! is an American sitcom that appeared on NBC during the 1966–1967 season, sponsored by Procter & Gamble in the 8:30-9pm Eastern time period on Sunday nights. It is notable for its casting director Fred Roos, who later became a producer for Francis Ford Coppola. Roos discovered the counterculture sketch group The Committee in San Francisco and cast all members in bit parts in Hey Landlord!. It also served as the first TV show for writer-director-producer Garry Marshall.

Plot, cast, and characters
This series stars Will Hutchins as Woody Banner, who learns that his uncle has died and that he has inherited from him a New York City brownstone apartment building in Manhattan's East 30s as its landlord. Other tenants in the building are Sandy Baron as comedian Chuck Hookstratten, Jack (Michael Constantine) who was a photographer, glamorous Theresa (Pamela Rodgers) and her roommate and best friend Kyoto (Miko Mayama), who frequently yells, "Hey, Landlord!" thus giving the show its title. Other co-stars are Ann Morgan Guilbert, and Kathryn Minner, who at the time specialized in playing little old ladies. Sally Field later appeared in four episodes as Woody's visiting sister Bonnie.

Plots from a few episodes of the show were believed to have been later used on Marshall's series Laverne and Shirley.

Production
The series lasted one season of 31 episodes; the last episode aired on April 23, 1967.

Episode list

References 

Kliph Nesteroff interview with Carl Gottlieb, April 2013

External links 
 

1960s American sitcoms
1966 American television series debuts
1967 American television series endings
NBC original programming
Television series by United Artists Television
English-language television shows
Television shows about landlords